"M.I.L.F. $" (pronounced "MILF Money") is a song recorded by American singer Fergie for her second studio album, Double Dutchess (2017). It was produced by Polow da Don and released as the second single from the record following "L.A. Love (La La)" on July 1, 2016 by will.i.am Music Group and Interscope Records. It debuted at number 34 on the US Billboard Hot 100 with 65,000 in first-week sales.

Composition

Fergie was inspired to write the song after the birth of her son, Axl Jack. About its double meaning, she stated "Changing the acronym ["MILF: Moms I'd Like to Fuck"] is about empowering women who do it all. They have a career, a family, and still find the time to take care of themselves and feel sexy. With a wink of course." In a radio interview in the Zach Sang Show, Fergie said "I'm not running away from the fact that I am a mom [...] So I'm just gonna embrace it in a funny way," adding "What new mom doesn't want to be called a 'MILF' even though it feels wrong to say because originally what it stood for? Everybody's following somebody so why not just make it 'Moms I'd Like to Follow'."

Critical reception
Alexa Camp from Slant Magazine compared the song favorably to her previous single, "L.A. Love (La La)", saying "'M.I.L.F. $' makes her previous effort sound like something you might hear on Lite FM."

Music video

Background
The music video for "M.I.L.F. $" was conceptualized by Fergie and filmed with director Colin Tilley in Los Angeles. Set in a candy-colored town called "Milfville", it features Fergie with a group of famous mothers, including Ciara, Chrissy Teigen, Alessandra Ambrosio, Kim Kardashian, Gemma Ward, Devon Aoki, Angela Lindvall, Isabeli Fontana, Amber Valletta, and Natasha Poly as lingerie-clad 1950s housewives.

Later in the video, Fergie is shown waitressing at a soda shop, teaching a classroom full of rowdy, letterman jacket-wearing teens, and taking a bath in a tub filled with milk. The video ends with several mothers each shooting their own "Got Milf?" ads. Male models Jon Kortajarena and Jordan Barrett appear as a milkman and a bartender, respectively. Ambrosio's daughter Anja and Teigen's daughter Luna make appearances.

The video premiered online on Vevo on July 1, 2016. As of December 2022, the video has reached over 322 million views on the video-sharing website YouTube.

Filming
Teigen's daughter, Luna, was three weeks old when the video was filmed, so the crew took extra efforts to be considerate on set. According to Teigen, the set was closed, the air was turned off and people were cleared out. Teigen was accompanied by her husband John Legend on set.

Fashion
To prepare for the video, Swedish stylist B. Åkerlund planned for about two weeks, then took two more weeks to assemble the cast and select their clothing and accessories. Teigen wore an outfit from Moschino Couture while shooting her breastfeeding scene. For the milk shower scene, Kardashian wore a custom-made layered nude body suit from designer Atsuko Kudo to give an illusion of her being naked, while Fergie wore a yellow crop top that references the original album cover of Bon Jovi's Slippery When Wet album.

Formats and track listings

In addition to the single track as a digital download, a remix EP was released.

Charts

Certifications

Release history

References

2016 singles
2016 songs
Fergie (singer) songs
Interscope Records singles
Music videos directed by Colin Tilley
Song recordings produced by Polow da Don
Songs with feminist themes
Songs written by Fergie (singer)
Songs written by Polow da Don
Songs written by Webbie